The 1948 Villanova Wildcats football team represented the Villanova University during the 1948 college football season. The head coach was Jordan Olivar, coaching his sixth season with the Wildcats. The team played their home games at Villanova Stadium in Villanova, Pennsylvania.

Schedule

References

Villanova
Villanova Wildcats football seasons
Villanova Wildcats football